The Parliament is the national legislature of Equatorial Guinea. The bicameral parliament consists of a Senate and the Chamber of Deputies.

Notes

Politics of Equatorial Guinea
Equatorial Guinea